Ashwani Kumar (born 29 August 2001) is an Indian cricketer. He made his first-class debut on 9 December 2019, for Punjab in the 2019–20 Ranji Trophy. He made his List A debut on 8 December 2021, for Punjab in the 2021–22 Vijay Hazare Trophy.

References

External links
 

2001 births
Living people
Indian cricketers
Punjab, India cricketers
Place of birth missing (living people)